Run Baby Run (ரன் பேபி ரன்) is a 2022 Indian-Tamil language Reality game show, hosted by Jagan. The series aired for 23 episodes on Zee Tamil every Sunday at 13:00 from 27 February It is also available on the digital platform on ZEE5.  to 7 August 2022. It is also available for streaming on ZEE5.

Format
The show features Zee Tamil's soap opera families and the Tamil film industry in which the actors will showcase the physical and mental battle of two teams being pitted against each other in some exciting challenging tasks.

List of Episodes

References

Zee Tamil original programming
Tamil-language television shows
Tamil-language reality television series
2022 Tamil-language television series debuts
Tamil-language game shows
Television shows set in Tamil Nadu
2022 Tamil-language television series endings